Charles Erwin Booth (July 1, 1840 – September 9, 1907) was a member of the Wisconsin State Assembly.

Biography
Booth was born on July 1, 1840 in Washington, New York. After serving in the American Civil War with the 89th New York Infantry Regiment, he resided in Rock County, Wisconsin, and Walworth County, Wisconsin. In 1870, he graduated from Rush Medical College. The following year, Booth settled in Elroy, Wisconsin.

Assembly career
Booth was a member of the Assembly during the 1876 session. He was a Republican.

References

External links

People from Dutchess County, New York
People from Rock County, Wisconsin
People from Walworth County, Wisconsin
People from Elroy, Wisconsin
Republican Party members of the Wisconsin State Assembly
People of New York (state) in the American Civil War
Physicians from Wisconsin
Rush Medical College alumni
1840 births
1907 deaths